Theodore "Ted" Corday (May 8, 1908 – July 23, 1966) was a Canadian-American producer, director and co-creator of soap opera for NBC, most notably the hit series Days of Our Lives.

Biography
Born in Winnipeg, Manitoba, Corday graduated from the University of Alberta in 1930 and studied law before moving to the United States in 1934. He served as a Captain in the United States Army.

He worked in Broadway for many years before producing dramas for radio, such as Tortilla Flat, Tobacco Road, Gangbusters and Counterspy. He then moved to television in the 1950s, producing Guiding Light for a time as well as directing As the World Turns, from its 1956 premiere until 1965.

Corday was later lured to NBC to create three new soap operas. The first two, Paradise Bay and Morning Star, were not successful, but his third NBC serial, Days of Our Lives, was a success, and remains on the air as of 2022.

Death
Before Corday could pen many stories for the serial, he was diagnosed with cancer, and was admitted to Cedars-Sinai Medical Center. After many months in the hospital, he died on July 23, 1966 at the age of 58. His widow, Betty Corday, continued to produce Days of our Lives until her death in 1987.

Corday died just ten months after creating Days, which is now one of the longest running television shows still on the air in the world.

Executive Producing Tenure

References

External links 
 
 

1908 births
1966 deaths
Days of Our Lives
Soap opera producers
University of Alberta alumni
People from Winnipeg
Deaths from cancer in California
Canadian emigrants to the United States